Edward Wilkins  may refer to:

Edward Wilkins, namesake of Edwardsport, Indiana
Edward Wilkins, character in A Dark Night's Work
Edward Wilkins (cricketer) (1835–1921), later "Wilkins-Leir", English cricketer and clergyman

See also
Edward Wilkin, US soldier
Edward Wilkins Waite, landscape painter
Ted Wilkins, Edwin Wilkins, English rugby league footballer of the 1950s
Eddie Lee Wilkins, basketball player